Matthew Arlidge (born 1974) is an English author of crime novels starring DI Helen Grace. He has also worked in television.

Early life  

Matthew Arlidge was born in London in 1974, the youngest of four siblings. He grew up in Hampstead, North London, attending University College School from 7 to 18 years of age. In between school and university, he travelled, teaching in a school in southern India, as well as visiting Singapore and Australia. On his return to the UK, he studied for an English Literature degree at St John's College, Cambridge. During this period he won the Douglas Chivers prize for outstanding Shakespeare scholarship. He subsequently spent a year studying Film and Television Production at Bristol University.

Writing for television 

Arlidge's early career was in television production, starting at EastEnders, the BBC1 soap opera. He began as a story liner, later graduating to become a script editor. After 18 months there, he left to work for Ecosse Films, a British film and television production company, spending two years story-lining and editing the BBC One series Monarch of the Glen, which starred Richard Briers and Susan Hampshire. He then became a television development producer with the same company, creating new shows for BBC, ITV and Channel 4 such as Mistresses, which has been remade for US television, and Cape Wrath, which starred Tom Hardy, Felicity Jones and David Morrissey. In 2007, Arlidge set up his own production company, TXTV Limited, with colleagues Jeremy Gwilt and Chris Lang. He executive-produced a number of British crime serials, including Torn, The Little House and Undeniable. Arlidge has also written for other crime series, including Silent Witness.

Novels 

Arlidge's first novel was published in May 2014. Eeny Meeny introduced British police officer Detective Inspector Helen Grace. Other Helen Grace novels followed, including Pop Goes the Weasel and The Doll's House. Several more Helen Grace novels are scheduled for release in the UK and other international markets, including the US, Germany, Italy, The Netherlands, Norway and France.

Arlidge’s series of novels is set in and around the English coastal city of Southampton. A tough, determined police officer who rides a motorbike and prefers to travel through life alone, she nevertheless is beset by personal demons. The legacy of a troubled childhood makes itself felt through her mood swings and tendency towards depression. She neither drinks nor takes drugs, so expiates her dark moods through the controlled use of pain, administered to her by her loyal dominator, Jake. She lives alone, takes occasional lovers and is deeply committed to her work. The criminals she pursues are sadistic, violent and determined, meaning Helen has to put her life on the line to bring them in. She is assisted by a number of colleagues at Southampton Central, most notably her loyal friend, DC Charlene "Charlie" Brooks.

Six Degrees of Assassination 

In 2015, Arlidge wrote a ten part audio thriller for Audible, with a cast including Andrew Scott, Hermione Norris and Freema Agyeman.

Bibliography

Helen Grace novels

Helen Grace short stories

Standalone novels

References

1974 births
Living people
English crime fiction writers
English television writers